Thelosia mayaca is a moth in the Apatelodidae family. It was described by William Schaus in 1939. It is found in Peru.

References

Natural History Museum Lepidoptera generic names catalog

Apatelodidae
Moths described in 1939
Moths of South America